Sylvia Burka (born May 4, 1954, in Winnipeg, Manitoba) is a former ice speed skater and track cyclist from Canada of Latvian descent, who represented her native country at three consecutive Winter Olympics, starting in 1972 in Sapporo, Japan. She was the first person in history to win a World Championship in both Allround and Sprint disciplines (1976 and 1977). She never won an Olympic medal, with her best Olympic result being the fourth place in 1000 m in 1976.

In 1977, she was inducted into Canada's Sports Hall of Fame. In 1983 she was inducted into the Manitoba Sports Hall of Fame and Museum. She was married to Jocelyn Lovell, an Olympic cyclist.

References

External links
Sylvia Burka’s biography at Manitoba Sports Hall of Fame and Museum

1954 births
Living people
Canadian people of Latvian descent
Canadian female speed skaters
Canadian female cyclists
Speed skaters at the 1972 Winter Olympics
Speed skaters at the 1976 Winter Olympics
Speed skaters at the 1980 Winter Olympics
Olympic speed skaters of Canada
Speed skaters from Winnipeg
World Allround Speed Skating Championships medalists